Traces may refer to:

Literature
Traces (book), a 1998 short-story collection by Stephen Baxter
Traces series, a series of novels by Malcolm Rose

Music

Albums
Traces (Classics IV album) or the title song (see below), 1969
Traces (Jean-Jacques Goldman album), 1989
Traces (Karine Polwart album), 2012
Traces (The Ransom Collective album) or the title song, 2017
Traces (Steve Perry album), 2018
Traces, by Don Williams, 1987
Traces, by Seals and Crofts, 2004

Songs
"Traces" (song), by the Classics IV, 1969
"Traces", by Built to Spill from You in Reverse, 2006

Other uses
Traces, Texas, US
TRACES, Trade Control and Expert System, a web-based veterinarian certification tool
Traces (TV series), a 2019 British crime drama
Traces (software), an Amiga ray trace engine written by Ton Roosendaal

See also 
 Trace (disambiguation)
 Trace evidence, used in forensic science
 Digital traces